Parmouti 20 - Coptic Calendar - Parmouti 22

The twenty-first day of the Coptic month of Parmouti, the eighth month of the Coptic year. In common years, this day corresponds to April 15, of the Julian Calendar, and April 28, of the Gregorian Calendar. This day falls in the Coptic Season of Shemu, the season of the Harvest.

Commemorations

Feasts 

 Monthly commemoration of the Virgin Mary, the Theotokos

Saints 

 The departure of Saint Hierotheos, Bishop of Athens

References 

Days of the Coptic calendar